ART PAPERS is an Atlanta-based bimonthly art magazine and non-profit organization dedicated to the examination of art and culture in the world today. Its mission is to provide an independent and accessible forum for the exchange of perspectives on the role of contemporary art as a socially relevant and engaged discourse. This mission is implemented through the publication of ART PAPERS magazine and the presentation of public programs.

History and profile
ART PAPERS was established in 1976 as the internal newsletter (originally known as Atlanta Art Workers Coalition Newspaper) of the Atlanta Art Workers Coalition.  The AAWC was formed in 1976 under the premise to “promote, protect, and aid the visual artists of Atlanta through programs focused on the need of individual artists and art groups.” In addition to the newspaper, the coalition maintained other programs and publications: an Information Resource Center; the Coalition Gallery; and the Metro Atlanta Directory of Visual Arts. In 1980, the newspaper was renamed Atlanta Art Papers and soon evolved into a publication to encourage the growth of art criticism in Georgia. Atlanta Art Papers became ART PAPERS in 1981 and has since developed into an internationally and nationally recognized platform for contemporary art document, experiment and criticism while also rooted in Southern identity. In addition to the bi-monthly magazine, ART PAPERS , as a non-profit organization, supports programming such as a live lecture series called ART PAPERS LIVE, an artist project commission series ART PAPERS  LEARN, and an exhibitions program. ART PAPERS has been a recipient of various grants and fellowships including the Andy Warhol Foundation for the Visual Arts. The Editor and Artistic Director is Sarah Higgins. The magazine is headquartered in Atlanta, Georgia.

Notable editors-in-chief 
 Julia Fenton, Founding Editor (1975-1977)
 Laura Lieberman, Co-Founder and Editor (1977-1984)
 Dan R. Talley, Co-Founder and Editor (1980-1982)
 Sylvie Fortin (2004-2012), formerly Executive and Artistic Director La Biennale de Montréal 
 Victoria Camblin (2013–2018)
Sarah Higgins, Editor and Artistic Director (2018–present)

Notable guest and contributing editors 

 Sarah Workneh, co-director at Skowhegan School of Painting and Sculpture
 Fahamu Pecou, Visual/performing artist and scholar
 Dushko Petrovich, painter and creator of Adjunct Commuter Weekly
 Robert Wiesenberger, graphic design critic
 Niels Van Tomme, curator, researcher and critic
 Erin Dziedzic, contemporary art curator
 Jerry Cullum, Visual art critic
 Susan Morgan
 Alex P. White, Malone art studio founder'
 Nuit Banai, Art Historian and Critic 
 D. Eric Bookhardt, writer and art critic
 Susan Canning, art historian, independent curator and critic
 Michael Fallon, arts writer 
 Susan W. Knowles, independent curator 
 Jennie Klein, writer 
 Pil and Galia Kollectiv, artists and writers
 Paul Krainak, painter and critic 
 David Moos, curator

Notable contributors 

 Theaster Gates, Social Practice Installation Artist 
 Ai Wei, Contemporary artist and activist 
 Wendy and Amy Yao, Musicians 
 James Franco, Actor, writer, poet, filmmaker 
 Alanna Heiss, Founder and Director of Clocktower Productions
 Rhizome, a not-for-profit arts organization
 Justin Vivian Bond, singer-songwriter, author, painter, performance artist, occasional actor, drag queen, and Radical Faerie
 Strauss Bourque-LaFrance, artist
 MALONE,  collaborative design/art studio
 Will Corwin, independent curator  
 Institute of Contemporary Art, Philadelphia 
 MoMA PS1

References

External links

1976 establishments in Georgia (U.S. state)
American contemporary art
Bimonthly magazines published in the United States
Contemporary art magazines
Magazines established in 1976
Magazines published in Atlanta
Quarterly magazines published in the United States
Visual arts magazines published in the United States